The Kashin class, Soviet designation Project 61, were series of anti-aircraft guided-missile destroyers built for the Soviet Navy since the 1960s. , no ships remain in service with the Russian Navy, but three modified ships continue in service with the Indian Navy as s.

In the Soviet Union they were officially classified as "guard ships" (storozhevoi korabl – SKR), then "large ASW ships" (BPK) or "large missile ships" (BRK), but in the rest of world they are commonly regarded as missile destroyers due to their size and armament. They were the first Soviet purpose-built anti-air warfare ships and the first to carry an ASW helicopter.

Design

The design specification was approved in 1957; the first ship was laid down in 1959 and commissioned in 1962. Many new components were developed for these ships, including surface-to-air missiles, radars, and gas turbine engines. The gas turbines were arranged in two separate spaces and could be removed via the funnels for servicing. These were also the first Soviet ships designed to be closed down for nuclear fallout and had an operations room deep inside the ship rather than a large bridge.

The final ship in the class, Sderzhanyy, was completed to a modified design as the Project 61M or 61MP (Kashin-Mod), being fitted with four SS-N-2C Styx anti-ship missiles, new towed-array sonar, a raised helipad and four close range AK-630 Gatling guns. The two RBU-1000 ASW rocket launchers were mounted aft, but later removed. Six ships were modernised to this standard in the 1970s.

 was modernised (Project 01090) at Sevastopol in the early 1990s and fitted with new Kh-35 (SS-N-25 Switchblade, Harpoonski) anti-ship missiles and MNK-300 sonar. In 2020 she decommissioned and opened as a Museum at Sevastopol.

The  modification built for the Indian Navy has the aft gun turret replaced by a hangar for a helicopter, as well as SS-N-2C anti-ship missiles on the sides of the bridge.

Variants
 Project 61 (Kashin class): Original design (19 ships).
 Project 61MP (Modified Kashin class): Modernization of the Project 61 vessels (5 ships).
 Project 61M (Modified Kashin class): Upgraded design (1 ship).
 Project 61E: Export version, used by the Indian Navy (5 ships).

Ships

In all, twenty ships were built for the Soviet Navy, one ship was later transferred to Poland, while five similar ships were built to a modified design for the Indian Navy as Rajput class.

See also
List of ships of the Soviet Navy
List of ships of Russia by project number
List of naval ship classes in service

References

Notes

Sources
 
 V.V. Kostrichenko, A.A Prostokishin (В.В.Костриченко, А.А.Простокишин): "Poyushchiye fryegaty". Bolshiye protivolodochniye korabli proyekta 61 («Поющие фрегаты» Большие противолодочные корабли проекта 61), Morskaya Kollektsya 1/1999

External links 

 – article in Russian
– article in English from the Federation of American Scientists
All Russian Kashin Class Destroyers – Complete Ship List

 
Destroyer classes
Ships of the Russian Navy
Ships of the Soviet Navy